Edmundsella vansyoci is a species of sea slug, an aeolid nudibranch, a marine gastropod mollusc in the family Flabellinidae.

Distribution
This species is reported from the Pacific coast of central America from Punta Eugenia, Baja California, Mexico to Costa Rica.

Description
The body colour of Edmundsella vansyoci varies from pink to reddish pink. There are opaque white spots on the outer surfaces of the cerata. The rhinophores and oral tentacles are tinged with purple and have translucent tips. Externally Edmundsella vansyoci and Orienthella fogata can be separated by the location of the anus, which is in the middle of the inter-hepatic space in E. vansyoci and posterior, under the first or second post-hepatic ceras in O. fogata. These two species can also be distinguished by their cnidosacs, which are translucent white in O. fogata and pink in E. vansyoci. The maximum length of this species is 30 mm.

The description of Orienthella fogata includes a table comparing similar species from Mexico.

References

Flabellinidae
Gastropods described in 1994